The 2010 Polish Super Cup was held on 1 August 2010 between the 2009–10 Ekstraklasa winners Lech Poznań and the 2009–10 Polish Cup winners Jagiellonia Białystok. Jagiellonia Białystok won the fixture 1–0, winning the trophy for the first time in their history.

Match details

See also
2009–10 Ekstraklasa
2009–10 Polish Cup

References

Super Cup
Polish Super Cup